Locuras, tiros y mambos is a 1951 Argentine film.The director is Leo Fleider, and the writer is Carlos A. Petit. Music by Silvio Vernazza, and cinematography is by Ricardo Younis. This movie starred Rafael Carret, Jorge Luz, and Zelmar Gueñol.

Plot
The 'Big 5 of Good Humor' live in a theater that is about to be demolished. They try to convince the owner not to, and they learn that a gang of criminals dedicated to clandestine gambling operates in the theater.

Cast

References

1951 films
1950s Spanish-language films
Argentine black-and-white films
Argentine musical comedy films
1951 musical comedy films
1950s Argentine films
Films directed by Leo Fleider